Rimyŏngsu Sports Club  is a North Korean football club, based in Sariwŏn. Despite never winning the DPR Korea League, Rimyŏngsu supplied four players to the 2005 FIFA U-17 World Championship and five players to the 2007 FIFA U-20 World Cup, more than any other North Korean club. Like the Amrokkang Sports Club, Rimyŏngsu is affiliated with the Ministry of People's Security. It was named after General Ri Myŏng-su.

Forward Kang Kuk-chol was one of the top scorers in the 2015 edition of the Poch'ŏnbo Torch Prize.

In 2022, Rimyongsu won their first Hwaebul Cup after defeating 4.25 SC 2-1 with a goal from Jong Il-gwan in the second half.

Current squad

Managers
 Jo Tong-sam (2013)
 Ri Myong-ho (current)

Achievements

Domestic
DPR Korea League: 4
 1995, 1996, 2002
 2012

Hwaebul Cup: 1
 2022

Man'gyŏngdae Prize: 5
 2000, 2001, 2010, 2013
 2015

Paektusan Prize: 3
 2010, 2011
 2012

Poch'ŏnbo Torch Prize: 3
 2006, 2012
 2015

International
AFC President's Cup: 1
 2014

Continental record

References

External links
 North Korea 2007 FIFA U-20 World Cup squad 

 
Football clubs in North Korea
Police association football clubs in North Korea